2 Canadian Forces Flying Training School (2CFFTS) is one of the Royal Canadian Air Force's training centres for pilots and also one of the facilities of the NATO Flying Training in Canada (NFTC) program.

History

The school is located at CFB Moose Jaw. Prior to operating the CT-155 and CT-156, 2CFFTS flew the CT-114 Tutor from 1964 until 1999.

Pilots at the school are in the Advanced Training section of the CF program with focus on:
 Phase II – Basic course with the CT-156 Harvard II after which students will be streamed into the different platforms (jet, multi-engine, or helicopter).
 Phase III Jet – Advanced course on the CT-156 Harvard II
 Phase IV Conversion – Conversion to the CT-155 Hawk to prepare students for further training at CFB Cold Lake

Images

Badges

See also
1 Canadian Forces Flying Training School
3 Canadian Forces Flying Training School

References

External links
 

Flying Training Schools of Canada
Military units and formations established in the 1960s